Redenham is a small village in the civil parish of Appleshaw in the Test Valley district of Hampshire, England. It is in the civil Parish of Fyfield.  Its nearest town is Andover, which lies approximately 4.8 miles (7.7 km) south-east from the village.

Redenham House is a Grade II* listed country house which stands in Redenham Park.

See also
List of civil parishes in England

References

Villages in Hampshire
Test Valley